Luisito Lagdameo Ignacio (born April 2, 1968), better known as Louie Ignacio is a Filipino television director, film director, music video director, and painter. He studied AB Mass Communication in Centro Escolar University.

Ignacio also directs indie films including 2014 film Asintado which earned nominations in the International Filmmaker Festival of World Cinema and Gold Remi in the family/children's category on the 48th WorldFest Houston (Texas) International Film Festival, and Child Haus which won Best Child Film at the Dhaka International Film Festival in Bangladesh.

Ignacio is also a painter and displays exhibits of his works.

He is known for directing GMA Network's defunct variety shows like SOP and Party Pilipinas, where he later resigned weeks after the premiere. Ignacio is currently serving as the director of GMA programs such as Sarap, 'Di Ba?, TiktoClock,,The Clash and Eat Bulaga!.

Filmography

Music Video Director
Sharon Cuneta - Starlight
Sarah Geronimo - Broken Vow (feat. Mark Bautista) 
Sarah Geronimo - Sa Iyo 
Jaya - Honesty
Ogie Alcasid - Kung Mawawala ka
Janno Gibbs & Jaya - Ikaw Lamang
Janno Gibbs & Regine Velasquez - Evergreen
Janno Gibbs & Pops Fernandez - I Say A Little Prayer
Janno Gibbs & Pilita Corrales - Kapantay Ay Langit
Nyoy Volante & Mannos - Nasaan
Jolina Magdangal - Bahala Na 
La Diva - Kasiping Ka 
Jed Madela - Only Selfless Love (fea. Karylle) 
Ogie Alcasid - Huwag Ka Lang Mawawala 
Ogie Alcasid - Tanging Pag-Ibig 
Jonalyn "Jona" Viray - Close To Where You Are
Lani Misalucha - Tila
Jolina Magdangal - Let Me Be The One 
Rene Martinez - The Power to Unite (Read the Bible) 
Martin Nievera - Goodbye (feat. Pops Fernandez)
Martin Nievera - Hanggang Kailan 
Martin Nievera - Only Selfless Love II 
Martin Nievera - Never Say Goodbye
Ariel Rivera - Tell Me (feat. Regine Velasquez)
Regine Velasquez - Hold Me In Your Arms
Regine Velasquez - On the Wings of Love
Regine Velasquez - For The Love Of You
Regine Velasquez - One Love
Regine Velasquez - Lost Without Your Love
Regine Velasquez - In Your Eyes
Regine Velasquez - Shine
Regine Velasquez - My Miracle
Regine Velasquez - Pangarap Ko Ang Ibigin Ka
Regine Velasquez - Don't Go
Regine Velasquez - To Reach You
Regine Velasquez - Sa Aking Pag-Iisa
Gary Valenciano - Everybody Get Down
David Pomeranz - On This Day
Pops Fernandez - You Take My Breath Away
Regine Velasquez - Pangarap Ko'y Ikaw
Voyz Avenue (now TAKEOFF) - Ulap
Various Artists - Only Selfless Love
Various Artists - Kapuso Anumang Kulay Ng Buhay (GMA Network's 2007 Station ID; co-directed by Paul Ticzon)
Various Artists - Isang Kinabukasan
Aryana & Buko Pie - Ako Ang Nauna (Bumati Ng Merry Christmas)
Julie Anne San Jose - Right Where You Belong
Gabby Eigenmann - Mahal Mo Rin Ako
Alden Richards - Wish I May
Rita Daniela - Hahanap Hanapin Ka
Jessica Villarubin - Beautiful
Rita Daniela - Umulan Man O Umaraw
Jeric Gonzales - Hihintayin Kita (co-directed by Nathan Jacob Jesuitas)

TV Director

Shows

Drama

TV Specials

Movie Director

Television 

 Starstruck (2004 – 07) - Judge/Council (seasons 2–4)

References

External links
 

1968 births
Filipino film directors
Filipino television directors
Living people
Filipino LGBT artists
Artists from Laguna (province)
Centro Escolar University alumni
GMA Network (company) people
LGBT film directors
LGBT television directors